V. Volodarsky (December 11, 1891 – June 20, 1918) (born: Moisey Markovich Goldstein) was a Marxist revolutionary and  Soviet politician. He was assassinated in 1918.

Biography

Early years
V. Volodarsky was born to the family of a Jewish craftsman in Ostropol, in the Volhynian Governorate of the Russian Empire (present-day Ukraine).

Revolutionary politics
In 1905, he became involved in revolutionary activity within the General Jewish Labour Bund in Lithuania, Poland and Russia, but soon joined Spilka, the Ukrainian Social Democratic organisation which aligned itself with the Menshevik faction of the Russian Social Democratic Labor Party. He was briefly imprisoned in 1908 and then was politically active in Volhynia. Then in 1911 he was exiled by the government to Arkhangelsk, but was included in the general amnesty of 1913. Continued persecution led him to emigrate to the United States, settling in Philadelphia. Here he became active in the International Trade Union of Tailors and the Socialist Party. During World War I, Volodarsky sided with the internationalist Mensheviks and moved to the left. In 1916-1917, he was a contributor to the New York-based newspaper of the Russian Socialist Federation, Novy Mir (New World), edited by Nikolai Bukharin.

Return to Russia
In May 1917, Volodarsky returned to Russia, joined the Mezhraiontsy group and was elected to the Petrograd City Duma. Along with the rest of the mezhraiontsy, he joined the Bolsheviks at the 6th Party Congress in July–August 1917 and soon became one of their best known public speakers and agitators. He focused his activity in the Petergof area, including the Putilov factory.

In mid-October 1917, while the Bolsheviks were debating whether to try to overthrow the Russian Provisional Government, Volodarsky sided with Grigory Zinoviev and Lev Kamenev, who were against the insurrection. At the Second Congress of Soviets during the October Revolution of 1917, Volodarsky was elected to the All-Russian Central Executive Committee (VTsIK). He was appointed editor of the Red Gazette in Petrograd and chief of the Press Division of the Executive Committee of the Union of Northern Communes. This gave him broad censorship powers.

His colleague Anatoly Lunacharsky wrote:
 And he was ruthless. He was imbued not only with the full menace of the October Revolution, but with a foretaste of the outbursts of Red terror which were to come after his death. There is no sense in concealing the fact that Volodarsky was a terrorist. He was profoundly convinced that if we were to falter in lashing out at the hydra of counter-revolution it would devour not only us but along with us the hopes that October had raised all over the world.

He was against the Brest-Litovsk Treaty, but remained silent on the topic in order to maintain party discipline.

Death
Volodarsky was assassinated on June 20, 1918 by Grigory Ivanovich Semyonov, a member of the Central Battle Unit of the Socialist-Revolutionary Party, during labour unrest at the Obukhov Works in Petrograd. He was buried at the Monument to the Fighters of the Revolution on St. Petersburg's Field of Mars.

Honors 

In 1918, the town of Poshekhonye was renamed Poshekhonye-Volodarsk (Пошехо́нье-Волода́рск). It reverted to its original name in 1992. The town Volodarsk was named after him in 1920. The sewing factory established at the seized Esders and Scheefhaals department store in 1919 was named in Goldstein's honor in 1922. Streets throughout the USSR were named in his honor; see a partial list in Russian Wikipedia. The Volodarsky Bridge, located near where he was killed, was named after him. The munitions works in Ulyanovsk was briefly renamed for him (Zavod Volodarskogo - "Volodarsky's Factory") from 1928 to 1941.

See also
 Pishchalauski Castle, prison building in Minsk, Belarus, known after the 1918 revolution as the Volodarka, after the "V. Volodarsky Street" on which it stands

References

External links
Anatoly Lunacharsky on Volodarsky

1891 births
1918 deaths
People from Khmelnytskyi Oblast
People from Volhynian Governorate
Ukrainian Jews
Bundists
Mensheviks
Mezhraiontsy
Old Bolsheviks
Jewish socialists
Jewish Soviet politicians
People murdered in Russia
Assassinated Russian politicians
Assassinated Jews
Russian revolutionaries
Ukrainian revolutionaries
Burials on the Field of Mars (Saint Petersburg)